Matthew Timothy Hoppe (born March 13, 2001) is an American professional soccer player who plays as a forward for Scottish Premiership club Hibernian, on loan from Middlesbrough, and the United States national team.

Club career

Youth career and Schalke 04
Hoppe played a single season with the LA Galaxy academy, before being released by the team. After playing for the Barça Residency Academy in Arizona, Hoppe signed with Schalke 04 in June 2019.

On November 28, 2020, he made his professional debut for Schalke against Borussia Mönchengladbach in the Bundesliga. On January 9, 2021, he scored a hat-trick, and his first senior goals for Schalke, in a league match against Hoffenheim. Hoppe became the first American to score a hat-trick in the Bundesliga and the 4–0 result also meant that the club ended their 30 game winless streak in the league.

Hoppe signed his first professional deal at Schalke on February 1, 2021, keeping him at the club until 2023.

Mallorca
Hoppe moved to La Liga club Mallorca on August 31, 2021, the last day of the 2021 summer transfer window. The transfer fee paid to Schalke 04 was reported as €3.5 million plus possible bonuses. Hoppe made only seven appearances for the club across all competitions in a debut season that was beset with injuries and a bout of COVID-19.

Middlesbrough
On August 10, 2022, Hoppe signed a four-year deal with EFL Championship side Middlesbrough. Hoppe was loaned to Scottish Premiership club Hibernian in January 2023.

International career
Hoppe received his first call-up to the United States ahead of a friendly against Switzerland on May 20, 2021.
 He was named to the United States roster for the 2021 CONCACAF Gold Cup. Hoppe earned his first international cap when he was named in the starting 11 in the second group stage match of the competition against Martinique. On July 25, Hoppe scored his first national team goal against Jamaica in a 1–0 win for the United States in the quarter-finals of the tournament.

Personal life
Hoppe is the son of Tom and Anna Hoppe. He is of German descent through his father's lineage. He has two older siblings; one brother and one sister. Hoppe is a Christian.

Career statistics

Club

International

Scores and results list the United States' goal tally first, score column indicates score after each Hoppe's goal.

Honors
United States
CONCACAF Gold Cup: 2021

Individual
Bundesliga Rookie of the Month: January 2021

References

External links
 
 
 
 Matthew Hoppe at US Soccer Development Academy

2001 births
Living people
People from Yorba Linda, California
Sportspeople from Orange County, California
Soccer players from California
American soccer players
Association football forwards
United States men's international soccer players
CONCACAF Gold Cup-winning players
2021 CONCACAF Gold Cup players
LA Galaxy players
California United Strikers FC players
FC Schalke 04 II players
FC Schalke 04 players
RCD Mallorca players
Middlesbrough F.C. players
Hibernian F.C. players
Bundesliga players
2. Bundesliga players
Regionalliga players
La Liga players
American expatriate soccer players
American expatriate soccer players in Germany
American expatriate sportspeople in Spain
Expatriate footballers in Spain
American expatriate sportspeople in England
Expatriate footballers in England
American expatriate sportspeople in Scotland
Expatriate footballers in Scotland
Scottish Professional Football League players